The 1956 United States presidential election in West Virginia took place on November 6, 1956, as part of the 1956 United States presidential election. West Virginia voters chose eight representatives, or electors, to the Electoral College, who voted for president and vice president.

West Virginia was won by incumbent President Dwight D. Eisenhower (R–Pennsylvania), running with Vice President Richard Nixon, with 54.08 percent of the popular vote, against Adlai Stevenson (D–Illinois), running with Senator Estes Kefauver, with 45.92 percent of the popular vote. Along with Kentucky and Louisiana, West Virginia was one of three states that Dwight Eisenhower lost in 1952, but managed to flip in 1956.

This is the only time between the Republican landslides of 1928 and 1972 that a Republican won West Virginia, and only one of three times between 1932 and 1996 that a Republican did so (the others being the aforementioned 1972 as well as 1984).

Eisenhower was the first Republican to carry Jefferson County and Calhoun County since Ulysses S. Grant in 1868, and the first to carry Hampshire County since Abraham Lincoln in 1864.

Results

Results by county

Notes

References

West Virginia
1956
1956 West Virginia elections